Serhii Yemelianov (Ukrainian: Сергій Олександрович Ємельянов) (born 28 May 1993 in Kremenchuk) is a Ukrainian paracanoeist. He won a gold medal at the 2016 and 2020 Summer Paralympics in the Men's KL3.

References

External links
 

1993 births
Living people
People from Kremenchuk
Sportspeople from Dnipro
Ukrainian male canoeists
Paracanoeists of Ukraine
Paralympic medalists in paracanoe
Paralympic gold medalists for Ukraine
Paracanoeists at the 2016 Summer Paralympics
Paracanoeists at the 2020 Summer Paralympics
Medalists at the 2016 Summer Paralympics
Medalists at the 2020 Summer Paralympics
ICF Canoe Sprint World Championships medalists in paracanoe